The 1979 Scottish Cup Final was contested between Rangers and Hibernian. After goalless draws in the initial match and the replay, Rangers won the Cup by winning 3–2 after extra time in the second replay.
The winning goal for Rangers was an own goal scored with his head by Arthur Duncan.

Match details

Teams

Replay

Teams

Second Replay

Teams

References 

1979
Cup Final
Hibernian F.C. matches
Rangers F.C. matches
1970s in Glasgow
May 1979 sports events in the United Kingdom